Atbara (sometimes Atbarah) ( ʿAṭbarah) is a city located in River Nile State in northeastern Sudan.

Because of its links to the railway industry, Atbara is also known as the "Railway City'.

As of 2007, its population is 111,399.

History 
The confluence of the Nile and its most northern tributary, the Atbarah River  (Bahr-el-Aswad, or Black River) was a strategic location for military operations.  in the year 1619 Atbara was conquered and sacked by forces of the Ethiopian Empire.  In the Battle of Atbara, fought on 8 April 1898 near Nakheila, on the north bank of the river, Lord Kitchener's Anglo-Egyptian army defeated the Mahdist forces, commanded by Amir Mahmud Ahmad.  Kitchener's strengthened position led to a decisive victory at the Battle of Omdurman on 2 September 1898, giving the British control over the Sudan.

The town was the centre of the Sudanese railway industry. Few trains are made here now and rail traffic is much reduced. The original station and unusual dome-shaped houses of railway workers remain.  The first trade union in Sudan formed in 1946 among railroad workers in Atbara. 

Perhaps because of the influence of the railway unions, Atbara is also considered by many to be the home of Sudanese communism. Jaafar Nimeiri, Sudan's president throughout the 1970s, alternated between communism, capitalism, and Islamic fundamentalism – depending on who he was trying to get on his side and extract money from – and the communist phase had its stronghold around Atbara.

Atbara was also the starting point for mobilizations against the regime in December 2018.

Geography
Atbara is located at the junction of the Nile and Atbarah rivers.

Atbara is made up of several districts including Umbukole district which was home to the First Higher School in Atbara. Other districts include the railway district, Almurabaat, Alsawdana and Almatar.

Umbukole was originally the name given to a capital city in a northern state in Kurti county. It is now mostly remembered as the name of a small district in Atbara.

One of the major districts of Atbara is Al-Dakhla (الداخلة) in Arabic. Some still use the name Al-Dakhla referring to Atbara.

Economy
Atbara is an important railway junction and railroad manufacturing centre, and most employment in Atbara is related to the rail lines. The Sudanese National Railway Company's headquarters are located in Atbara. 

The city also is home to one of Sudan's largest cement factories, the Atbara Cement Corporation.

Climate
Atbara has a hot desert climate (Köppen climate classification BWh). The annual mean temperature reaches over 30 °C (86 °F) and the average highs exceed 40 °C (104 °F) during 7 months of the year. The annual average rainfall is 60 mm, mostly from July and August. Atbara is sunny, averaging 3,545 hours of bright sunshine per year or 81% of possible sunshine.

Another chart with different averages is shown below.

Demographics

Notable residents
A well-known resident was Mandour Elmahdi, who wrote A Short History of the Sudan.

See also
 Ethiopia - border country for the Blue Nile.

References

External links

 FallingRain Map - elevation = 356m (Red dots are railways)

Populated places in River Nile (state)